The 1878 Pennsylvania gubernatorial election occurred on November 5, 1878. Incumbent governor John F. Hartranft, a Republican, was not a candidate for re-election. Republican candidate Henry M. Hoyt defeated Democratic candidate Andrew H. Dill and Greenback candidate Samuel R. Mason to become Governor of Pennsylvania.

This election extended the governor's term from three to four years.

Results

References

1878
Pennsylvania
Gubernatorial
November 1878 events